The Shulamite is an Edwardian drama, or melodrama, based on a novel of the same name. It played in London and New York in 1906 with Lena Ashwell in the lead role. It tells of a South African farmer's wife trapped in an unhappy marriage who falls in love with a visiting Englishman. In a dramatic scene the husband is killed. The death is made to seem an accident, but the lovers must part. Later the play was changed to give it a happy ending. The Shulamite was well received in London, but had limited success in the USA. It was made into a silent film The Shulamite in 1915, later renamed as The Folly of Desire, and in 1921 was made into the silent film Under the Lash with Gloria Swanson.

Background
The play is a dramatisation by Edward Knoblock of the novel The Shulamite by the prolific romance writers Alice and Claude Askew.
The Shulamite, probably meaning "the woman from Shulem", is a Biblical character mentioned in the Song of Solomon. She was the bride of a shepherd, but her great beauty attracted Solomon, who tried to win her for his harem.

Plot
The story is set in the Transvaal, South Africa. Deborah is the wife of the brutal farmer Simeon Krillet, who beats her. She falls in love with Waring, an Englishman who is staying with them to learn farming. Waring tries to escape the situation, but his horse is struck by lightning and he has to return. He finds that Krillet has read his diary and knows about the love between him and Deborah. Waring defends Deborah, and is forced to kill Krillet in self-defense. The couple takes the body to Waring's horse, making it seem that Krillet had died in the lightning strike. When Waring plans to return to England where his alcoholic wife is dying, Deborah becomes jealous and tells the true story of Krillet's death to his sister. She agrees not to reveal the secret on the condition that the lovers never meet again.

London production
The play had only six characters, so could be staged at low cost, which made it attractive to Lena Ashwell's syndicate. It opened at the Savoy Theatre in London on 12 May 1906, with Ashwell in the lead role and Norman McKinnel as Krillet. The play ran for 45 performances at the Savoy between 12 May and 26 June 1906. The cast was:

Lena Ashwell as Deborah Krillet
Norman McKinnel as Simeon Krillet
Henry Ainley as Robert Waring
Eugene Mayeur as Jan Vanderberg
Elsie Chester as Tante Anna Vandenberg
Beryl Mercer as Memke

On 12 June the play was revised to give the third act a happy ending. The critic J. T. Grein called the production melodramatic and in poor taste. However, the Evening Standard was enthusiastic about Ashwell's dramatic performance. The Era said it was,

United States

Ashwell took The Shulamite across the Atlantic, introducing it in Chicago. The Shubert Brothers produced the play in the United States. Advance notices said "The Shulamite, according to the London reviewers, ranks even ahead of Pinero's His House in Order as the most powerful play of the London season." Later reviews were tepid. A New York critic warned theatergoers on 21 October 1906, "Miss Ashwell has been a competent and prominent actress in London for several years now, but in reading of her work I have never seen the emphasis placed so heavily on her poetic and imaginative qualities as the Chicago brethren place it. The quality is fortunate and timely, because from all accounts The Shulamite, which we shall see next week, sadly needs poetry for its appreciation."

The play opened at the Lyric Theatre, New York, on 29 October 1906, and closed the next month after just 25 performances. It was directed by J. C. Huffman. The cast was:

Lena Ashwell (her Broadway debut)
John Blair	
George Le Guere	
Edward R. Mawson	
Maude Granger	
Beryl Mercer (her Broadway debut)

The New York Times critic wrote that Ashwell "had been rather badly handicapped on her first visit here by a bad play ... Miss Beryl Mercer, who appeared as a little Kaffir slave, is most to be commended for a bit of character that is pathetically appealing. After New York, the play was staged in the Shubert Theatre in Brooklyn in December 1906.

Film versions

The Shulamite was made into a film in 1915, later renamed The Folly of Desire, directed by George Loane Tucker. The cast was:

Norman McKinnel as Simeon Knollett
Manora Thew as Deborah
Gerald Ames as Robert Waring
Mary Dibley as Joan Waring
Gwynne Herbert as Mrs. Waring
Minna Grey as Tanta Anna
Bert Wynne as Jan Van Kennel

The Shulamite was used as the basis for the 1921 silent movie Under the Lash starring Gloria Swanson, Russell Simpson and Mahlon Hamilton, directed by Sam Wood. The dark and gloomy screenplay, and Swanson's role without glamorous gowns and jewellery, was a deliberate change from her former roles. The movie included advanced special effects in the storm sequence, where trees were blown up to appear as though they had been struck by lightning.

References

Sources

External links 

 

1906 plays
Broadway plays
West End plays
British plays adapted into films
Plays based on novels
South Africa in fiction
Plays by Edward Knoblock